Fantagio is a South Korean entertainment company that operates as a record label, talent training and management agency, as well as movie and K-drama production company. The company was founded in September 2008 as N.O.A. Entertainment (standing for "Network of Asia"), before being renamed to Fantagio in June 2011. In 2012, the company had a reported operating income of KR₩14.1 billion with a net income of KR₩1.8 billion (approximately US$1.6 million).

History

2008–2013: Company creation and initial goals 
The company was founded on September 16, 2008 as N.O.A. Entertainment by Na Byeong-jun, who previously worked for SidusHQ. From the start, the company focused on talent training and management, with goals of expanding to other ventures like music and movie production. During this time, the company held regular auditions, where they discovered many talented rookies, some of which became representative domestic actors, such as Ha Jung-woo, Jung Il-woo, and Kim Sae-ron.

In June 2011, the company changed its name to Fantagio (compound word of "Fantasy" and "Origin"). The company started its research and development program, with the goal of training and debuting their own K-pop idol groups. The project soon became known as "i-Teen", and was split into i-Teen Boys (which became Astro) and i-Teen Girls (which became Weki Meki). Fantagio also started its actor training program, "Actors League".

In November 2011, Fantagio Corp. created subsidiaries Fantagio Pictures, for film and TV drama production, Fantagio Music, for music production, and Solid C&M, for other ventures.

2012–2015: First groups and actors 
In May 2012, Fantagio and Pledis Entertainment started a joint venture, and together debuted their first girl group, Hello Venus. On July 31, 2014, the joint venture was terminated due to a conflict between companies, and Fantagio took charge of the group. In the process of termination, 2 members left the group and 2 new members were added. Hello Venus disbanded in May 2019, after their contract expired.

In 2014, in order to improve their stock market status, Fantagio merged with Edu Company, a KOSDAQ listed company. Although Edu Company was the surviving company in the merger, the name was quickly changed back to Fantagio, with Na Byeong-jun becoming the CEO once again.

On February 23, 2016, the company debuted its first male idol group, ASTRO, with the release of Spring Up. Within a week of its release, it reached number 6 on the Billboard World Albums Chart. It entered the 10th place on the Japanese Tower Records K-Pop chart. It also ranked 4th in the album section of the Gaon Chart, an official domestic music chart. Since their debut, ASTRO has sold over 1,5 million albums.

In 2015, Choi Yoo-jung and Kim Do-yeon competed in the survival show Produce 101, as representatives of Fantagio. They made it into the top 11 and debuted into I.O.I, a temporary girl group under CJ E&M. The group debuted on May 4, 2016, and promoted until the end of January 2017, when the girls returned to their company. Due to group's immense popularity, the fans were curious about the girls' future activities. It was eventually revealed that "i-Teen Girls" would debut on August 8, 2017 under their official name, Weki Meki. Since their debut, the group sold over 180 thousand albums.

2016–present: Controversies regarding ownership and management 
In 2016, Fantagio sold part of its shares to Gold Finance Korea, the Korean branch of JC Group, which is a Chinese real estate and investment company. In 2017, through a paid-in capital increase, JC Group invested more capital in Fantagio and became a major shareholder in the company (owning over 50 percent of stocks). JC Group then dismissed CEO Na Byung Joon, the founder of Fantagio, and put Wei Jie in his place, which resulted in several actors and key staff members at Fantagio leaving the agency.

In May 2018, it was announced that Fantagio lost its membership in Korea Entertainment Management Association.

In April 2019, Wei Jie was arrested in China on fraud charges. In July 2019, Park Hae-sun was added as a co-CEO, and in March 2020 changed to sole CEO.

On May 27, 2020, Gold Finance Korea sold it stocks to L&A Holdings, making them the majority stakeholder. This led to another change in ownership and management, with Hyo-Seop Ji being added as co-CEO on September 24, 2020, then both CEOs being replaced with Park Jae-hong on November 23, 2020.

On February 10, 2021, CEO Park Jae-Hong was changed to CEO Ji Hyo-Seop. On February 15, 2021, CEO Ji Hyo-seop was changed to Park Jong-jin and Shin Young-jin respectively. On February 24, 2021, the largest shareholder was changed from L&A Holdings to Mirae ING.

In September 2021, Fantagio moved into the building formerly owned by SM Entertainment.

On December 30, 2021, Fantagio announced the reduction of capital by the merger of stocks to compensate for the company's loss. The merger took place on February 4, 2022.

On January 6, 2023, it was announced that the company went back to single CEO system and that CEO Park Jong-jin resigned for personal reasons.

Subsidiaries
The company currently has 3 subsidiaries: 

 Fantagio Hong Kong is an entertainment company based in Hong Kong
 Studio Invictus is a drama production company based in South Korea
 Metagio is an entertainment company based in Singapore

Defunct subsidiaries

Madin Entertainment 
In January 2011, Fantagio founded its acting management division, Madin Entertainment. As of 2015, Fantagio managed over 50 actors and actresses. On December 31, 2015, all stocks of Madin Entertainment owned by Fantagio were sold to yarn manufacturing company, Kahi.

Fantagio Music 
Fantagio Music was the record label and music production division. It operated as a subsidiary of Fantagio from November 12, 2011 until November 9, 2021, but has since merged with the parent company. In May 2012, Fantagio launched the girl group Hello Venus as part of Tricell Media, a joint venture with Pledis Entertainment; this was dissolved in 2014 and Hello Venus continued under Fantagio Music. Hello Venus disbanded in May 2019. In September 2013 it debuted 5URPRISE, a project boy group whose members are primarily in Fantagio's acting division. The six-member boy group Astro debuted in February 2016; the group also starred in their own drama, To Be Continued. In August 2017, the eight-member girl group Weki Meki debuted, with two members from former group I.O.I, Kim Do-yeon and Choi Yoo-jung. Aside from his acting activities, former Wanna One member Ong Seong-wu released his first mini album, Layers, marking his solo music debut.

Fantagio Pictures 
Fantagio Pictures is credited with production or co-production of the following works:
 Finding Mr. Destiny (2010)
 The Crucible (also known as Dogani or Silenced) (2011)
 Love Fiction (2012)
 Adrenalin (XTM serial) (2012)
 577 Project (2012)
 Bokbulbok after school (mobile drama; also known as After School: Lucky or Not) (2012)
 Fasten Your Seatbelt (2013)
 Cunning Single Lady (MBC serial) (2014, with IOK Media)
 Liar Game (tvN serial) (2014, with Apollo Pictures)
 To Be Continued (2015)
 Idol Fever (2017)
 Money Flower (2017)
 Dr. Prisoner (2019)
 My Lawyer Mr.Joe 2: Crime and Punishment (2019)
 I Hate You Juliet (2019)
 Born Again (2020)
 Mouse (2021)

Solid C&M 
Solid C&M was Fantagio's division for broadcast program production and content distribution rights. When the subsidiary was created, it was listed as the division for restaurant franchises, education, distribution, and other ventures. Cafe Fantagio was launched in September 2012, but has since been closed. In the past, Fantagio also had investments in dessert restaurant franchise Mango Six.

On March 4, 2013, founder Na Byeong-jun established Fantagio's Manager Training Academy, aiming to train future celebrity managers through a curriculum including classes in film and media relations.

In 2021, Fantagio sold their subsidiaries Fantagio Pictures, Solid C&M, Fantagio China and Fantagio Japan.

Artists

Actors and actresses

Baek Seo-bin
Baek Yoon-sik (2021–present)
Cha Eun-woo
Choi Jun-young
Choi Yoo-jung
Choi Yun-la
Chu Ye-jin
Elly
Eun Hae-seong (2017–present)
Han Gi-chan (2020–present)
Han Sae-yeon 
Jeon Da-in
Ji Geon-woo (2017–present)
Jin Su-hyun
Joe In (2021–present)  
Kang Hae-lim
Kim Geun-su
Kim Do-gyung
Kim Do-yeon
Kim Hyun (2021–present) 
Kim Hyun-seo (2017–present)
Kim Mi-hwa
Kim Nu-rim
Kim Si-hyun
Lee Jong-uk
Lim Hyun-sung
Lucy
Moon Bin
Moon Yoon-bin
Ong Seong-wu
Park Hae-in
Park Ye-rin (2021–present) 
Sei
Seo Jun
Yoon Jeong-hyuk (2017–present)
Yoon San-ha
Source:

Recording artists
Groups
Astro
Weki Meki

Sub-units
Astro - Moonbin & Sanha

Soloists
 Ong Seong-wu
 MJ
 Choi Yoo-jung

Former artists

Astro
Rocky (2016–2023)
Cha In-ha (2017–2019)
Gong Hyo-jin
Gong Myung (2013–2020)
Gong Yoo
Ha Jung-woo (2002–2016)
Hello Venus (2012–2019)
 Alice/Song Joo-hee (2012–2019)
 Nara (2012–2019)
Lime/Chae Ju-hwa (2012–2021)
Yooyoung/Lee Hwa-kyum (2012–2021)
Lee Seo-young (2014–2022)
Yu Na-gyeol/Yeoreum (2014–2022)
Hwang Bo-ra (2014–2016)
Im Soo-jung (until 2011)
Ji Jin-hee (2009–2013)
Joo Jin-mo (until 2016)
Jo Yoon-hee
Jung Chan-woo (2010–2013)
Jung Gyu-woon (2008–2016)
Jung Il-woo (2010–2012)
Jung Kyung-ho (2008–2015)
Kang Chan-hee (2009–2013)
Kang Han-na (2013–2020)
Kang Tae-oh (2013–2020)
Kim Da-hyun (1999–2014)
Kim Sae-ron (2009–2016)
Kim So-eun (2008–2016)
Kim Seo-hyung (until 2015)
Kim Sun-a (2014–2015)
Kim Sung-kyun (2012–2018)
Kim Sung-soo (2008–2015)
Kim Young-ae (2008–2016)
Lee Chun-hee
Lee So-yeon (2014–2017)
Lee Tae-hwan (2013–2020)
Park Sol-mi
Seo Kang-joon (2013–2020)
Seo Min-ji (2011–2013)
Sung Yu-ri (2014–2015)
Yoo Il (2013–2020)
Yoon Seung-ah (2010–2016)
Yum Jung-ah (2004–2017)

References

External links
 

Talent agencies of South Korea
South Korean record labels